"Wonderful Copenhagen" is a song and single written by Frank Loesser performed by Danny Kaye with Gordon Jenkins and his orchestra and released in 1953.

It was taken from the 1952 film,  Hans Christian Andersen and is considered to be the best known song in the film. It occurs in the film where Andersen, played by Kaye, is about to be expelled from Odense and his apprentice Peter advocates going to Copenhagen. 

The single reached number five in the UK Singles Chart in 1953 during a 10-week stay on the chart.

Legacy
Loesser had never visited the city when he wrote the song. The Danish people took to the song and Loesser was greeted as a national hero when he later visited the country.
The song was used by the local tourist organisation but was not a hit in Denmark due to Kaye's pronunciation of "Copenhagen" making the word sound German and thus neither English nor Danish.

References

1952 songs
1953 singles
Danny Kaye songs
Songs written by Frank Loesser
Songs about Copenhagen
American children's songs
Brunswick Records singles
Songs written for films